"Annamede", also known as Davisson-Blair Farm, is a historic home located near Walkersville, Lewis County, West Virginia.  It was built in 1901, and is a -story, 17 room red brick mansion in the Classical Revival style. The front facade features a massive, two-story. portico supported by large fluted Corinthian order columns.  It also has a one-story front porch that extends 3/4 of the way around each side.  Also on the property are a contributing carriage house, smoke house, caretaker's cottage, stone grotto and goldfish pond, and three farm outbuildings.

It was listed on the National Register of Historic Places in 1987.

References

Neoclassical architecture in West Virginia
Farms on the National Register of Historic Places in West Virginia
Houses completed in 1901
Houses in Lewis County, West Virginia
Houses on the National Register of Historic Places in West Virginia
National Register of Historic Places in Lewis County, West Virginia